The Paradise Walk Wuhan Jiangchen Tower 1 is a skyscraper complete in Wuhan, Hubei, China. The mixed-use tower is set to rise  and contain 50 floors.

References

Skyscraper office buildings in Wuhan
Proposed buildings and structures in China